The San Juan Formation is a geologic formation in Argentina. The formation comprising limestones, mudstones and marls was deposited in a shallow marine reefal environment and preserves many fossils dating back to the Ordovician period. The formation overlies the La Silla Formation and crops out in the Precordillera of San Juan Province.

See also 
 Geological history of the Precordillera terrane
 Mesón Group

References

Further reading 
 J. L. Benedetto. 2012. Gatosella, a new basal plectambonitoid brachiopod with undercut cardinal process from Middle Ordovician limestones of the Precordillera terrane, Argentina. Journal of Systematic Palaeontology 10(3):435-443
 M. G. Carrera. 2006. The new genus Multispongia (Porifera) from the Lower Ordovician limestones of the Argentine Precordillera. Ameghiniana 43(2):493-498
 M. G. Carrera. 2000. Epizoan-sponge Interactions in the Early Ordovician of the Argentine Precordillera. Palaios 15:261-272
 B. Kröger, M. S. Beresi, and E. Landing. 2007. Early orthoceratoid cephalopods from the Argentine Precordillera (Lower-Middle Ordovician). Journal of Paleontology 81(6):1266-1283

Geologic formations of Argentina
Ordovician System of South America
Ordovician Argentina
Limestone formations
Mudstone formations
Marl formations
Reef deposits
Shallow marine deposits
Ordovician southern paleotemperate deposits
Geology of San Juan Province, Argentina